Väinö Edward Tiiri (31 January 1886 – 30 July 1966) was a Finnish gymnast who competed in the 1908 Summer Olympics and in the 1912 Summer Olympics.

Sport 

He was in the Finnish team leadership in the 1924 and 1928 games.

He won the Finnish national championship in team gymnastics as a member of Ylioppilasvoimistelijat in 1909.

He was the leader of the Suomen Urheilulehti editorial staff in 1909–1917. He edited sports-related articles in the encyclopedia Pieni tietosanakirja.

He held positions of trust in several national-level sports federations.

Career 

He completed his matriculation exam in Turku Finnish Real Lycaeum in 1907 and graduated as a gymnastics teacher in 1911. He worked as a gymnastics teacher up to 1952.

He completed Artillery Officer School in 1918 and eventually reached the rank of major in 1928. He served as a battalion commander in the World War II.

He was an editor in Uusi Suomi and Suomen Sotilas.

Politics 

He was one of the members of the central committee responsible of the creation of the Jäger Movement. He was nominated an honorary jäger in 1961.

Accolades 

He received the following honorary awards:
 Cross of Liberty, 3rd Class
 Cross of Liberty, 4th Class
 Knight (Chevalier) of the White Rose of Finland
 The Jaeger Activist Medal
 memorial medals of three wars

Family 

His parents were Kalle and Maria Tiiri. He married Helmi Koski in 1921. His only child was named Juhana.

References 

1886 births
1966 deaths
Finnish male artistic gymnasts
Gymnasts at the 1908 Summer Olympics
Gymnasts at the 1912 Summer Olympics
Olympic gymnasts of Finland
Olympic silver medalists for Finland
Olympic bronze medalists for Finland
Olympic medalists in gymnastics
Medalists at the 1912 Summer Olympics
Medalists at the 1908 Summer Olympics
People from Loimaa
20th-century Finnish people